Flemming Ahlberg (born 23 November 1946) is a Danish former footballer who participated in the 1972 Olympics in Munich.

Ahlberg, who later worked as an electrician, was voted Danish Player of the Year in 1976. He was also part of the Frem team that won the 1978 Danish Cup after playing three finals in a span of three months. Ahlberg participated in the last two finals and scored in the penalty shootout in the third.

Honours
Individual
Danish Player of the Year: 1976
Team
Danish Cup: 1978 with Frem

External links
Danish national team profile
 Boldklubben Frem profile 
1978 Danish Cup final at haslund.info

Danish men's footballers
Denmark international footballers
Denmark under-21 international footballers
Boldklubben Frem players
Footballers at the 1972 Summer Olympics
Olympic footballers of Denmark
1946 births
Living people
Association football defenders
Skovshoved IF players
People from Gentofte Municipality
Sportspeople from the Capital Region of Denmark